{{Infobox person
| name               = Erika Sainte
| image              = 
| alt                = 
| caption            = 
| other_names        = 
| birth_name         = 
| birth_date         = 
| birth_place        = 
| death_date         = 
| death_place        = 
| nationality        = Belgian
| occupation         = Actress
| years_active       = 
| known_for          = She is Not Crying, She is SingingMontparnasse Bienvenue
| notable_works      = 
}}

Erika Sainte (born 14 July 1981) is a Belgian actress. In 2012, she won the Magritte Award for Most Promising Actress for her role in She is Not Crying, She is Singing.

 Biography 
In 2000, Erika Sainte graduated from the Academy of Ixelles, Artistic Humanities Section. She then studied dramatic art at the Institut des arts de diffusion in Louvain-la-Neuve. In 2004, she graduated from the institute.

 Filmography 

 Acting 

 Feature films 

 Short films 

 Television films 

 2002: Passage du bac: Madame Dercourt
 2018: Jacqueline Sauvage: C'était lui ou moi: Carole
 2018: Victor Hugo, ennemi d’État: Léonie d'Aunet

 Television series 
{{columns-list|*2011: Interpol: Julia Neuvens ("La vie devant soi")
2014-2016: Euh: Sylvie (web series)
2016-2018: Baron Noir: Fanny
Since 2018: The Crimson Rivers: Lieutenant Camille Delaunay
2021: Mon ange' (miniseries): Nadine Bastien
2021: I Killed My Husband: Anna}}

 Directing 

 Feature films 

 2017: Je suis resté dans les bois (co-directed with Michaël Bier and Vincent Solheid)

 Theatre performances 

 2005: Vincent in Brixton at Rideau de Bruxelles
 2005: La Mastication des morts at Rideau de Bruxelles
 2005: Terre des Folles at the Zone Urbaine Théâtre
 2005: Uncle Vanya at Théâtre de la Vie
 2014: Who’s Afraid of Virginia Woolf?'' at Théâtre Le Public in Brussels

Awards and nominations

References

External links

1981 births
Belgian stage actresses
Belgian film actresses
Belgian television actresses
Living people
Magritte Award winners